The Danish Women's Cup, or Sydbank Kvindepokalen (previously 3F Cup) for sponsorship reasons, is the national women's football cup competition in Denmark and was first held in 1993.

List of finals
The list of finals:

By titles

See also
Danish Cup, men's edition

References

External links
Cup Website

Den
Women
Recurring sporting events established in 1993
Cup